Seo Yoo-jung is a South Korean actress. She is known for her roles in dramas such as Forbidden Love, Steal Heart, Family's Honor, Mr. Sunshine, Royal Family, If Tomorrow Comes and Bloody Heart.

Personal life
In 2017 she married a office worker named Jeong Hyeong-jin at a wedding hall in Samseong-dong, Seoul. On February 24, 2023, Seo announced that they had recently gotten divorced.

Filmography

Television series

Film

Awards and nominations

References

External links 
 
 

1978 births
Living people
People from Seoul
Actresses from Seoul
21st-century South Korean actresses
South Korean television actresses
South Korean film actresses